Robert Johannes Livländer (1 February 1903 Tallinn – 6 October 1944) was an Estonian astronomer and geodesist.

In 1932, he defended his doctoral thesis at Tartu University.

1941–1944, he was the rector of Tallinn Polytechnical Institute.

He was one of the developer of the gravimetric network of Baltic states.

References

1903 births
1944 deaths
Estonian astronomers